Seongsan Station may refer to:

Seongsan Station (Suncheon), a station of the railway Jeolla Line
Songsan Station (Kangwon Line)
World Cup Stadium station (Seoul)
Namchuncheon Station
Digital Media City Station